Ringoes is an unincorporated community located within East Amwell Township in Hunterdon County, New Jersey, United States. The community is served by the United States Postal Service as ZIP Code 08551 and as of the 2010 United States Census, the area had a population of 5,532.

Demographics

History
Ringoes is the oldest known settlement in Hunterdon County. The village grew up around John Ringo's Tavern on the Old York Road, now Route 179. The tavern was the site for many meetings of the Hunterdon Chapter of the Sons of Liberty formed in 1766.

Notable people
People who were born in, residents of, or otherwise closely associated with Ringoes include:
 James Buchanan (1839–1900), represented New Jersey's 2nd congressional district from 1885 to 1893
 Matt Ioannidis (born 1994), defensive end for the Washington Redskins of the National Football League.
 Andrew Maguire (born 1939), represented New Jersey's 7th congressional district from 1975 to 1981
 Tom Malinowski (born 1965), representative of New Jersey's 7th Congressional District in the United States House of Representatives since 2019.
 Horace Griggs Prall (1881–1951), acting Governor of New Jersey in 1935.
 Jason Read (born 1977), rower who was a gold medalist in the Men's 8+ at the 2004 Summer Olympics.
 Herb Ringer (1913–1998), amateur photographer.

Economy
Tabby's Place, cat sanctuary
Old York Cellars, winery
Unionville Vineyards, winery
Black River and Western Railroad, tourist and freight railroad

Climate
The climate in this area is characterized by hot, humid summers and generally cold winters.  According to the Köppen Climate Classification system, Ringoes has a hot-summer humid continental climate, abbreviated "Dfa" on climate maps.

References

East Amwell Township, New Jersey
Unincorporated communities in Hunterdon County, New Jersey
Unincorporated communities in New Jersey
National Register of Historic Places in Hunterdon County, New Jersey